This article lists artworks produced by Marc Chagall (6 July [O.S. 24 June] 1887 – 28 March 1985), a painter who is associated with the modern movements after impressionism. The listing follows marcchagallart.net and Harris, The life and works of Chagall.

1906–1910, Russia

1910–1914, France

1914–1922, Russia

1923–1941, France

1941–1948, USA

1948–1985, France

See also
Musée Marc Chagall

Notes

References

External links
Works of Marc Chagall within Google Arts & Culture

Neo-primitivism
Russian avant-garde